Alpioniscus is a southern European genus of woodlice in the family Trichoniscidae. Alpioniscus consists of two subgenera: Alpioniscus s.s. and Illyrionethes. A 2019 study used molecular and taxonomic analyses to verify the validity of the current taxonomy, resulting in the redescription of several species and the description of two new species.

Species
 Alpioniscus absoloni (Strouhal, 1939)
 Alpioniscus alzonae = Alpioniscus fragilis (Brian, 1921)
 Alpioniscus balthasari (Frankenberger, 1937)
 Alpioniscus boldorii Arcangeli, 1952
 Alpioniscus bosniensis (Frankenberger, 1939)
 Alpioniscus caprai = Alpioniscus feneriensis (Colosi, 1924)
 Alpioniscus christiani Potočnik, 1983
 Alpioniscus dispersus = Alpioniscus feneriensis (Racovitza, 1907)
 Alpioniscus epigani Vandel, 1959
 Alpioniscus escolai Cruz & Dalens, 1989
 Alpioniscus feneriensis (Parona, 1880)
 Alpioniscus fragilis (Budde-Lund, 1909)
 Alpioniscus giurensis Schmalfuss, 1981
 Alpioniscus haasi (Verhoeff, 1931)
 Alpioniscus henroti Vandel, 1964
 Alpioniscus heroldi (Verhoeff, 1931)
 Alpioniscus herzegowinensis (Verhoeff, 1931)
 Alpioniscus iapodicus Bedek, Horvatović & Karaman, 2017
 Alpioniscus hirci sp. nov. Bedek & Taiti
 Alpioniscus karamani Buturović, 1954
 Alpioniscus kratochvili (Frankenberger, 1938)
 Alpioniscus magnus (Frankenberger, 1938)
 Alpioniscus matsakisi Andreev, 1984
 Alpioniscus medius =  Spelaeonethes medius (Carl, 1908)
 Alpioniscus metohicus (Pljakić, 1970)
 Alpioniscus sideralis sp. nov Taiti & Argano, 2019.
 Alpioniscus skopjensis = Macedonethes skopjensis Buturović, 1955
 Alpioniscus slatinensis Buturović, 1955
 Alpioniscus strasseri (Verhoeff, 1927)
 Alpioniscus thracicus Andreev, 1986
 Alpioniscus trogirensis Buturović, 1955
 Alpioniscus tuberculatus (Frankenberger, 1939)
 Alpioniscus vardarensis (Buturović, 1954)
 Alpioniscus vejdovskyi (Frankenberger, 1939)
 Alpioniscus velebiticus sp. nov. Bedek & Taiti
 Alpioniscus verhoeffi (Strouhal, 1938)

References

 

Woodlice